Tachyporinae is a subfamily of rove beetle. Their common name is crab-like rove beetles. They are generally small, roughly  2.4 to 5 millimeters.

There are around 60 species in twelve genera of crab-like rove beetles. All species are fusiform.

gallery

References

 
Beetle subfamilies